Shakhtyor Soligorsk is an ice hockey club, based in Soligorsk, Belarus. It was founded in 2009.  It is playing in the Belarusian Extraliga.  The team was formed to act as farm club for HC Dynamo Minsk of the KHL.

External links
Official website

Ice hockey teams in Belarus
Belarusian Extraleague teams
Mining sports teams
2009 establishments in Belarus
Shaktyor Soligorsk